Folk Songs of the Hills is a 1947 album by American singer Merle Travis. It is a collection of traditional songs from his home of Muhlenberg County, Kentucky, including original compositions evoking working life on the railroads and in the coal mines.  Each song, accompanied by Travis on his own acoustic guitar, is introduced by a short narrative. Because of these characteristics, the album can be considered an early example of the concept album in popular music, along with Woody Guthrie's Dust Bowl Ballads and Frank Sinatra's In the Wee Small Hours. First issued as a 78 rpm box set album in 1947, this collection has remained in print in LP and CD reissues up to the present, with additional tracks from the same period added in later editions (the original album had eight songs, the most recent edition has 13).

Folk Songs of the Hills is widely regarded as one of Travis' finest achievements. A seminal work in his career, it brought him fame as an interpreter of traditional American folk music, as a brilliant finger-style guitarist, and as a folk-inspired composer whose songs "Dark as a Dungeon" and "Sixteen Tons", included in all editions of this album, have become classics of folk, country and popular music. In 2018, it was selected for preservation in the National Recording Registry by the Library of Congress as being "culturally, historically, or artistically significant."

History
In 1944, Merle Travis moved to Hollywood, California, where he made a living by performing minor roles in Western films and playing with Ray Whitley's Western Swing Band. At the time, Capitol A & R man and producer Lee Gillette was looking for a way to enter the rising market for traditional American folk music created by singers and musicians such as John Jacob Niles, Burl Ives, Josh White, Woody Guthrie, Lead Belly, and The Golden Gate Quartet. Travis was known for his broad repertoire of country standards and outstanding guitar playing.  Gillette signed him to a recording contract in 1946 and asked him to record a series of folk and folk-inspired songs accompanying himself on an acoustic guitar (although he usually played a hollow-body electric).  The recordings that resulted, taking place at two dates in August 1946, led to the eight titles that appeared in the original 78 rpm version of Folk Songs of the Hills, one of the earliest examples of a concept album. Though a commercial flop at the time, the album was widely admired by musicians, and Travis was invited to preserve some of his performances in a series of Snader Transcriptions, an early form of music video, which can be viewed today on several internet sites and DVDs.  In 1955, one song from the album, "Sixteen Tons", was recorded by Tennessee Ernie Ford and became a million-selling crossover hit.  A number of other songs from the album, such as "Dark as a Dungeon" and his arrangement of "Nine-pound Hammer," entered Travis's regular repertoire and are considered standards.

As the American folk music revival gathered steam in the 1950s, the album was reissued on LP with a new cover under the title Back Home (Capitol Records T-891, 1957), adding four more tracks from electrical transcriptions made earlier by Travis in the same style for radio  broadcast.  Its first appearance on CD was as a remastered reissue by Bear Family Records 1993, including all 12 songs in Back Home,  where it was coupled with the thematically related 1963 Capitol LP Songs of the Coal Mines.  The latest reissue to date is Capitol's own remastered CD of 1996 (Capitol Vintage 35810), reprising all songs of the previous reissues as well as a further track dating from the 1940s, "This World is Not My Home".

Track listing (1996 Capitol edition)
"Nine Pound Hammer" (Traditional)
"John Henry" (Traditional)
"Sixteen Tons" (Travis)
"Dark as a Dungeon" (Travis)
"That's All" (Travis)
"Over by Number Nine" (Travis)
"I Am a Pilgrim" (Traditional)
"Muskrat" (Traditional)
"This World is Not My Home" (Traditional)
"John Bolin" (Traditional)
"Possum up a Simmon Tree" (Traditional)
"Barbara Allen" (Traditional)
"Lost John" (Traditional)

Only tracks 1–8 appeared on the original 1947 release Folk Songs of the Hills.
Tracks 10–13 were added to the 1957 LP reissue Back Home and the subsequent Bear Family reissue Folk Songs of the Hills (Back Home/Songs of the Coalmines).  Track 9 first appears on the 1996 Capitol reissue.

Personnel
Merle Travis – vocals and acoustic guitar

References

1947 albums
Merle Travis albums
Capitol Records albums
Covers albums
United States National Recording Registry recordings
United States National Recording Registry albums